William Wood (11 November 1849 – 12 April 1924) was an Australian cricketer. He played in two first-class matches for New South Wales in 1874/75.

See also
 List of New South Wales representative cricketers

References

External links
 

1849 births
1924 deaths
Australian cricketers
New South Wales cricketers
People from Banffshire